Corinne Wasmuht (born 1964) is a German visual artist based in Berlin.

Early life and education
Wasmuht was born in 1964 in Dortmund, Germany. From 1983 to 1992 she studied at the Kunstakademie Düsseldorf in Düsseldorf, Germany.

Career
Wasmuht's work deals with issues such as globalization, economic crisis, the proliferation of technology, and modern warfare. She makes paintings in oil paint on wooden boards, using many coats of varnish to add to the brightness of the colours.  Her images consist of layered fictional environments that reference abstract painting. Wasmuht paints all elements of her complexly layered and graphic paintings entirely by hand.
Of her Bibliotheque/CDG-BSL (2011), Peter Plagens said:  "As is often the case, a single work can represent the thrust of a show. Here it's Corinne Wasmuht's enormous triptych... It's a daunting painting... Its wildly varying scale (partial human figures five feet tall to some no more than little clots of paint) and institutional glare are supposed to say something, one assumes, about the socially, politically and culturally overwhelmed and unmoored state in which we currently exist."

Art market
Wasmuht was represented by Johann König until 2022.

Select exhibitions
1999
Neues Gestirn, Consortium Amsterdam, Amsterdam
Damenwahl (with Jason Rhoades), Kunsthalle Bremen
European Factory, Galleria darte moderna Bologna, Bologna
2001
Musterkarte, Palacio Conde Duque, Madrid
2003
Kunsthalle Baden-Baden, Baden-Baden
Aus dem Archiv, Kunstverein Hamburg, Hamburg
2004
Wandbild, Projektraum Deutscher Künstlerbund, Berlin
Contemporary Art from Germany, Europäische Zentralbank, Frankfurt
2005
Vanishing Point, Wexner Center for the Arts, Ohio
2008
Friedrich Petzel Gallery, New York
2010
Kunsthalle Nurnberg 
2011
Kunstraum Innsbruck, Austria
2014
Kunsthalle Kiel, Germany
2015
Friedrich Petzel Gallery, New York
2016
SCAD Museum of Art, Savannah, Georgia
2017
Kunstmuseum Stuttgart

Honours and awards
 1996: ars viva prize, Cologne
 2008: Heitland Foundation, Celle
 2011: Oberrheinischer Kunstpreis, Offenburg
 2011: August Macke Prize, Meschede
 2014: Käthe Kollwitz Prize by the Academy of Arts, Berlin

References

External links
Corinne Wasmuht on ArtNet.com
Further information from the Saatchi Gallery
Corinne Wasmuht at Berliner Poster Verlag

Living people
1964 births
Artists from Berlin
Artists from Dortmund
20th-century German painters
21st-century German painters
Members of the Academy of Arts, Berlin